Rahav has been borne by three ships of the Israeli Navy and may refer to:

 , a S-class submarine launched in 1945 as HMS Sanguine, she was transferred to Israel in 1958 and decommissioned in 1968.
 , a  launched in 1977 and decommissioned in 1997.
 , a  launched in 2013

Israeli Navy ship names